Acacia lachnophylla is a shrub belonging to the genus Acacia and the subgenus Phyllodineae that is endemic to south western Australia.

Description
It has hairy branchlets with caducous stipules. Like most species of Acacia it has phyllodes rather than true leaves. the evergreen phyllodes can be crowded or irregularly verticillate, on raised projections. It produces yellow flowers from August to October.

Distribution
It is native to an area in the southern Wheatbelt and Goldfields-Esperance regions of Western Australia where it is commonly situated on flats, undulating plains and low rises growing in sandy, clay loam or gravelly soils. The bulk of the population is found between Peak Charles National Park, Norseman and Grass Patch and also around Ravensthorpe further to the west. It is usually part of low heath, low mallee woodland or open dwarf scrubland communities.

See also
List of Acacia species

References

lachnophylla
Acacias of Western Australia
Taxa named by Ferdinand von Mueller
Plants described in 1882